Multi-project chip (MPC), and multi-project wafer (MPW) semiconductor manufacturing arrangements allow customers to share mask and microelectronics wafer fabrication cost between several designs or projects.

With the MPC arrangement, one chip is a combination of several designs and this combined chip is then repeated all over the wafer during the manufacturing. MPC arrangement produces typically roughly equal number of chip designs per wafer.

With the MPW arrangement, different chip designs are aggregated on a wafer, with perhaps a different number of designs/projects per wafer. This is made possible with novel mask making and exposure systems in photolithography during IC manufacturing. MPW builds upon the older MPC procedures and enables more effective support for different phases and needs of manufacturing volumes of different designs/projects. MPW arrangement support education, research of new circuit architectures and structures, prototyping and even small volume production.

Worldwide, several MPW services are available from companies, semiconductor foundries and from government-supported institutions. Originally both MPC and MPW arrangements were introduced for integrated circuit (IC) education and research; some MPC/MPW services/gateways are aimed for non-commercial use only. Selecting the right service platform at the prototyping phase ensures gradual scaling up production via MPW services taking into account the rules of the selected service.

MPC/MPW arrangements have also been applied to microelectromechanical systems (MEMS), integrated photonics like silicon photonics fabrication and microfluidics.

A refinement of MPW is multi-layer mask (MLM) arrangement, where a limited number of masks (e.g. 4) are changed during manufacturing at exposure phase. The rest of the masks are the same from the chip to chip on the whole wafer. MLM approach is well suited for several specific cases:

 Large (even possibly whole wafer) designs like detectors, where by using few mask layers it is possible to form functional devices
 Making different versions of one design/project like for different performance or standards of one design

Typically MLM approach is used for one wafer batch (consisting of several wafers depending on the fabrication line) and for one customer. By using MLM it is possible to get larger devices (even up to wafer size) or larger number of dies and wafers up to few batches typically. MLM is a smooth continuation from MPW production volumes upwards and therefore this may support also small/mid size volume production. Not all foundries support MLM arrangements.
 
Due to the complexity of the technologies available and the need to run MPC/MPWs smoothly, following the rules and timing of the designs are critical for leveraging the benefits of MPC/MPW services. However every service provider has its own practicalities including design data, die sizes, design rules, device models, ready IP blocks available and timing etc.

Turn around times and cost of MPC and MPW services depend on the manufacturing technology and designs/prototypes are typically available as bare dies or as packaged devices. Deliveries are untested, but in most of the cases the quality of the manufacturing process is guaranteed by the measurement results of process control monitor(s) (PCM) or similar.

MPC approach was one of the first hardware service platforms in semiconductor industry, and the more flexible MPW arrangement is continuing to be part of well established IC manufacturing and foundry model not limited to silicon IC manufacturing but spreading into other semiconductor production areas for cost effective prototyping, development and research.

Companies

CMC Microsystems 
CMC Microsystems is a not-for-profit organization in Canada accelerating research and innovation in advanced technologies. Founded in 1984, CMC lowers barriers to designing, manufacturing, and testing prototypes in microelectronics, photonics, quantum, MEMS, and packaging.  CMC technology platforms such as the ESP (Electronic Sensor Platform) jumpstart R&D projects, enabling engineers and scientists to achieve results sooner and at a lower cost. Annually, more than 700 research teams from companies and 100 academic institutions around the world access CMC’s services and turn more than 400 designs into prototypes through its global network of manufacturers. This support enables 400 industrial collaborations and 1,000 trained HQP to join industry each year, and these relationships assist in the translation of academic research into outcomes—publications, patents, and commercialization.

Muse Semiconductor 
Muse Semiconductor was founded in 2018 by former eSilicon employees. The company name "Muse" is an informal acronym for MPW University SErvice. Muse focuses on serving the MPW needs of microelectronics researchers. Muse supports all TSMC technologies and offers an MPW service with a minimum area of 1mm^2 for some technologies. Muse is a member of the TSMC University FinFET Program.

MOSIS 
The first well known MPC service was MOSIS  (Metal Oxide Silicon Implementation Service), established by DARPA as a technical and human infrastructure for VLSI. MOSIS began in 1981 after Lynn Conway organized the first VLSI System Design Course at MIT in 1978 and the course produced ‘multi-university, multi-project chip-design demonstration’ delivering devices to the course participants in 1979.  The designs for the MPC were gathered using ARPANET.  The technical background additionally to education was to develop and research in a cost effective way new computer architectures without limitations of standard components. MOSIS primarily services commercial users with MPW arrangement. MOSIS has ended their University Support Program. With MOSIS, designs are submitted for fabrication using either open (i.e., non-proprietary) VLSI layout design rules or vendor proprietary rules. Designs are pooled into common lots and run through the fabrication process at foundries. The completed chips (packaged or bare dies) are returned to customers.

NORCHIP 
The first international silicon IC MPC service NORCHIP was established among four nordic countries (Denmark, Finland, Norway and Sweden) 1981 delivering first chips 1982. It was funded by Nordic Industrial Fund and R&D financing organisations from each participating country. Targets were training and to enhance cooperation between research and industry specifically in areas of analog and digital signal processing and power management Integration. Parallel with NORCHIP  organised by same nordic countries there was Nordic GaAs program NOGAP 1986-1989, which produced modelling techniques for GaAs IC devices, and demonstrators of high speed digital and RF/analog MMICs.

CMP 
CMP a French company working since 1981. NORCHIP and NOGAP were the key enablers for the Pan-European MPC/MPW arrangement called EUROCHIP (1989-1995) and its follower EUROPRACTISE from 1995 on wards. CMP was also the first official pan-continental MPC/MPW operation having link to MOSIS among other MPW arrangements globally. CMPs services have included variety of technologies for digital, mixed signal, analog, high speed and power handling as well as multi-chip modules (MCMs) suitable for the packaging of chiplets. The CMP offers production of CMOS, SiGe BiCMOS, HV-CMOS, SOI, MEMS, 3D-IC, Si-Photonics, NVM (etc.) devices.

AusMPC 
Similar arrangements utilising silicon IC technology were also AusMPC in Australia starting 1981, E.I.S. project (started year 1983) in Germany and EUROEAST (1994-1997) covering Romania, Poland, Slovak Republic, Hungary, Czech Republic, Bulgaria, Estonia, Ukraine, Russia, Latvia, Lithuania and Slovenia.  BERCHIP MPC activity starting in 1994 was organised in Latin America. Numerous MPW services have been launched since 1994 worldwide.

Efabless

Skywater 
A partner of Efabless, a crowdsourcing design platform for custom IC manufacturing that has partnered with Google in 2020 to produce open-source IC devices.

References

External links
Alchips MPW service
CMC MPW
CMP MPC/MPW gateway to various foundries&technologies
Efabless Open MPW Shuttle Program
EUROPRACTICE MPC/MPW gateway to various foundries&technologies
MPW service from Globalfoundries
Jeppix MPW gateway to various photonics technologies
Integrated photonics MPW service from Ligentec
MOSIS MPC/MPW gateway to various foundries&technologies
Muse Semiconductor (MPW University SErvice)
Ommic MPW services
Samsungs MPW service
Smartphotonics MPW service
SMIC MPW service
TSMC CyberShuttle MPW service
UMC Silicon Shuttle MPW service
 MPW service from Teledyne Dalsa
MPW from Tower Semiconductor
XFABs prototyping options

Electronic design automation
Electronic engineering
Semiconductor device fabrication